Sorkun can refer to:

 Sorkun
 Sorkun, Gölhisar
 Sorkun, İskilip